Antonio Ambrogio Alciati (1878 – 8 March 1929) was an Italian painter mainly in Northern Italy.

Biography 
He was born in Vercelli, in the Piedmont. Initially studying at the Istituto di Belle Arti in Vercelli, in 1889, he moved to Milan, where he studied under Vespasiano Bignami and Cesare Tallone  at the Brera Academy. In 1920, he replaced Tallone as professor of figure at the academy. His portraits recall the impasto effects of Tranquillo Cremona, Giovanni Boldini, Mosè Bianchi, and Eugène Carrière.

He painted frescoes for the Villa Pirotta of Brunate (near Como) and also for churches in Lombardy. He was an active member of the Masons, rising in 1922 to the level of master.

Gallery

Note

Bibliography 
I ritratti di A. Alciati alla Quadriennale, in « L'illustrazione italiana »,  1908

External links 
 Treccani.it enciclopedia
 Ambrogio Alciati artworks (paintings, watercolours, drawings), biography, pictures, images, information and signatures

1878 births
1929 deaths
People from Vercelli
Brera Academy alumni
Academic staff of Brera Academy
Painters from Piedmont
19th-century Italian painters
20th-century Italian painters